Here is a list of people who claim to be channelers in communication with beings and spirits of the deceased, through the study and practice of mediumship. Mediumship is the practice of those people known as mediums that allegedly mediate communication between spirits of the dead and living human beings.

A
 Derek Acorah
 Rosemary Altea

B 

 Clifford Bias 
 Helena Blavatsky
 Emma Hardinge Britten 
 Sylvia Browne

C

 Theresa Caputo
 Lee Carroll
 Edgar Cayce
 George Chapman 
 Benjamin Creme
 Chip Coffey
 Florence Cook 
 Aleister Crowley

D

 Andrew Jackson Davis
 Jeane Dixon
 Allison DuBois

E

 John Edward

F

 Arthur Ford
 Colin Fry
 Divaldo Pereira Franco
 Fox sisters
 Matt Fraser (psychic)

G

 Eileen J. Garrett

H

 Victor Hennequin
 Tyler Henry
 Esther Hicks

I

J

 Linda and Terry Jamison
 Thomas John

K

 M. Lamar Keene
 J. Z. Knight

L

 Dada Lekhraj

M

 Char Margolis
 Ruth Montgomery
 Sally Morgan

N

O

P

 Eusapia Palladino
 Leonora Piper
 James Van Praagh

Q

R

 Paschal Beverly Randolph
 Tamara Caulder Richardson
 Jane Roberts

S

 Helen Schucman
 Gary Spivey
 Tony Stockwell
 Doris Stokes

T

 Stanisława Tomczyk

U

V

W

 Neale Donald Walsch
 Lorraine Warren
 Lisa Williams
 Jeanette Wilson

X

 Chico Xavier

Y

Z

See also
Conduit (channeling)

References